The 2015 Women's Futsal World Tournament was the sixth edition of the Women's Futsal World Tournament, the premier world championship for women's national futsal teams. The venue was Domo Polideportivo de la CDAG in Guatemala City. The competition was won by Brazil, winner of all the editions disputed until then.
Iran's Niloufar Ardalan notably defied a travel ban to take part in the 2015 tournament after her husband did not approve of her leaving Iran.

Venues

Group stage

Group A

Group B

Final round

Final ranking

References

External links
 Futsal Guatemala
 Futsal Planet

Women World Tournament
Women's Futsal World Tournament
Futsal
International futsal competitions hosted by Guatemala